John Joseph O'Reilly (24 April 1881 – 28 December 1967) was an Irish Cumann na nGaedheal and later Fine Gael politician and physician. He was born in Carrigallen, County Leitrim and practised as a GP in Tullyvin, County Cavan. 

He was first elected to Dáil Éireann as a Cumann na nGaedheal Teachta Dála (TD) at the March 1925 by-election for the Cavan constituency. He was re-elected at each subsequent election until the 1937 general election when he lost his seat to John James Cole, an independent Unionist.

References

1881 births
1967 deaths
Cumann na nGaedheal TDs
Fine Gael TDs
Members of the 4th Dáil
Members of the 5th Dáil
Members of the 6th Dáil
Members of the 7th Dáil
Members of the 8th Dáil
Politicians from County Leitrim
Politicians from County Cavan